The Women's flyweight is a competition featured at the 2011 World Taekwondo Championships, and was held at the Gyeongju Gymnasium in Gyeongju, South Korea on May 1 and May 2. Flyweights were limited to a maximum of 49 kilograms in body mass.

Medalists

Results
Legend
DQ — Won by disqualification
W — Won by withdrawal

Finals

Top half

Section 1

Section 2

Bottom half

Section 3

Section 4

References
Draw
Draw

Women's 49